Bereft is a 2004 television film written by Peter Ferland and directed by Tim Daly and J. Clark Mathis. Bereft is the first film Daly directed. It stars Vinessa Shaw, Michael C. Hall, Tim Blake Nelson, Marsha Mason, and Edward Herrmann. Set in Vermont, Bereft tells the story of a young widow haunted by the memory of her dead husband, while trying to date again.

Plot

A woman has a hard time embracing reality after a personal tragedy. Molly (Vinessa Shaw) is a young widow having a hard time putting her life back together after her husband's death. Molly obsesses over the leftover artifacts of his life, and she believes that his spirit walks the house they used to share, though her attempts to photograph the ghost are a failure. Molly supports herself by working at a photo shop, where the manager (Amy Van Nostrand) is convinced Molly needs to remarry, and isn't shy about dropping hints. But Molly seems to have built an emotional wall around herself until she meets an uncouth neighbor (Tim Blake Nelson) who lives in the neighborhood with his uncle. While she doesn't think much of him at first, Molly in time makes friends with the man, and under his spell, she develops a daring and impulsive streak.

Cast
 Vinessa Shaw as Molly
 Tim Blake Nelson as Denis
 Tim Daly as Uncle "Happy"
 Amy Van Nostrand as Jodi
 Edward Herrmann as Lloyd
 Sam Daly as Kenny
 Patrick Burleigh as Joel
 Marsha Mason as Helen
 Ari Graynor as Louise
 Michael C. Hall as Jonathan

External links

2004 films
2004 television films
2004 comedy-drama films
American comedy-drama television films
Films scored by Mark Snow
Films set in Vermont
2004 directorial debut films
2000s English-language films
2000s American films
English-language comedy-drama films